Jin Sang-houn (Hangul: 진상헌; born ) is a South Korean male volleyball player. He currently plays for the OK Financial Group Okman in the V-League.

Career

Clubs
Jin was selected by the Korean Air Jumbos with the third pick of the first round in the 2007 V-League Draft.

National team
In 2013 Jin was first selected for the South Korean senior national team to compete at the 2013 Asian Championship, where South Korea won the silver medal.

Jin also took part in the 2017 Asian Championship, where he helped his team to win the bronze medal.

External links
 Jin Sang-houn at the International Volleyball Federation (FIVB)

1986 births
Living people
Sportspeople from Seoul
South Korean men's volleyball players
21st-century South Korean people